Avenue C or C Avenue may refer to:

Transportation in New York City
 Avenue C (Brighton Beach Line), a local New York City Subway station in Brooklyn
 Avenue C (Brooklyn), a lettered avenue in Kensington, Brooklyn
 Avenue C (Manhattan), a north–south avenue in the Alphabet City area of East Village, Manhattan
 Avenue C Line, a local bus route in Manhattan
 Avenue C Railroad, original name of the Houston, West Street and Pavonia Ferry Railroad in lower Manhattan

Music
 "Avenue C", a song on the 1966 album The Big Band by Jimmy McGriff
 "Avenue C", a song on the 1974 album Barry Manilow II